Maureen Connolly defeated defending champion Doris Hart in the final 6–2, 6–4, to win the women's singles tennis title at the 1953 French Championships. With this win, Connolly became the first woman to complete the Career Grand Slam in Women's singles.

Seeds
The seeded players are listed below. Maureen Connolly is the champion; others show the round in which they were eliminated.

  Maureen Connolly (champion)
  Doris Hart (finalist)
  Shirley Fry (semifinals)
  Baba Mercedes Lewis (first round)
  Dorothy Head (semifinals)
  Angela Mortimer (third round)
  Jean Rinkel-Quertier (quarterfinals)
  Susan Chatrier (quarterfinals)
  Ann Gray (third round)
  Julia Sampson (third round)
  Nelly Adamson (quarterfinals)
  Helen Fletcher (third round)
  Ginette Bucaille (quarterfinals)
  Silvana Lazzarino (third round)
  Anne Shilcock (third round)
  Raymonde Jones-Veber (third round)

Draw

Key
 Q = Qualifier
 WC = Wild card
 LL = Lucky loser
 r = Retired

Finals

Earlier rounds

Section 1

Section 2

Section 3

Section 4

References

External links
   on the French Open website

1953 in tennis
1953
1953 in French women's sport
1953 in French tennis